Three Rivers and St. Maurice (also known as Three Rivers—St. Maurice) was a federal electoral district in Quebec, Canada, that was represented in the House of Commons of Canada from 1892 to 1935.

This riding was created as "Three Rivers and St. Maurice" riding in 1892 from Three Rivers and Saint Maurice ridings. It was renamed "Three Rivers—St. Maurice" in 1924 and defined to consist of the Cities of Three Rivers and Shawinigan Falls and the County of St. Maurice.

The electoral district was abolished in 1933 when it was redistributed into St-Maurice—Laflèche and Three Rivers ridings.

Members of Parliament

This riding elected the following Members of Parliament:

Election results

Three Rivers and St. Maurice, 1896–1925

By-election: On Mr. Bureau being appointed Solicitor-General of Canada, 14 February 1907

By-election: On Mr. Bureau's acceptance of an office of emolument under the Crown 3 January 1922

Three Rivers—St. Maurice, 1925–1935

By-election: On Mr. Bettez's death, 4 January 1931

See also 

 List of Canadian federal electoral districts
 Mauricie
 Past Canadian electoral districts

External links 

Riding history from the Library of Parliament:
 Three Rivers and St. Maurice (1892 - 1924)
 Three Rivers—St. Maurice (1924 - 1933)

Former federal electoral districts of Quebec